Callan is an unincorporated community in Menard County, Texas, United States.

References

Unincorporated communities in Menard County, Texas
Unincorporated communities in Texas